Panhar (also Romanized as Pānhar; also known as Pānar) is a village in Berentin Rural District, Bikah District, Rudan County, Hormozgan Province, Iran. At the 2006 census, its population was 783, in 168 families.

References 

Populated places in Rudan County